Norbert Krief (born 17 July 1956), often known as Nono, is a French rock guitarist.

Krief was the guitarist of hard-rock bands like  Shakin' Street and Trust. He later worked as lead guitarist for Johnny Hallyday and Fabienne Shine among a variety of other collaborations.

References 

1956 births
Living people
Krief,Norbert
Krief,Norbert
French rock guitarists
Trust (French band) members